Trioza remota is a sap-sucking hemipteran bug in the family Triozidae which creates galls on the leaves of oak (Quercus species).

References

Sternorrhyncha
Gall-inducing insects
Oak galls
Hemiptera of Europe
Insects described in 1848
Taxa named by Arnold Förster